These are the official results of the Women's 1500 metres event at the 1991 IAAF World Championships in Tokyo, Japan. There were a total number of 42 participating athletes, with three qualifying heats and the final held on Saturday August 31, 1991.

Medalists

Schedule
All times are Japan Standard Time (UTC+9)

Final

Qualifying heats
Held on Thursday 1991-08-29

See also
 1987 Women's World Championships 1500 metres (Rome)
 1988 Women's Olympic 1500 metres (Seoul)
 1990 Women's European Championships 1500 metres (Split)
 1992 Women's Olympic 1500 metres (Barcelona)
 1993 Women's World Championships 1500 metres (Stuttgart)

References
 Results

 
1500 metres at the World Athletics Championships
1991 in women's athletics